Schaefer (along with various similar spellings) is a surname of Germanic origin.

Schaefer, Schaffer, or Shafer may also refer to:

Places 
Cities and towns:
 Schaffer, Kansas, an unincorporated community in Rush County
 Shafer, Minnesota, a city in Chisago County
 Shafer Township, Chisago County, Minnesota, the township adjacent to the city
 Schaffer, Michigan, an unincorporated community in Delta County
 Schafer, North Dakota, an unincorporated community in McKenzie County
Landforms
 Lake Shafer, Indiana
 Schaefer Head, mountain in Pennsylvania
 Schaefer Islands, Antarctica
 Shafer Peak, Antarctica
 Shaffer Creek, a tributary of Brush Creek in Bedford County, Pennsylvania

Other uses 
 Schäferhund, German Shepherd Dog
 Schaefer Beer, a brand of beer from the United States
 Shaffer (company), a wholly owned subsidiary of National Oilwell Varco
 Schaefer Music Festival, formerly an annual music festival held in New York City's Central Park
 Schaffer paragraph, a five-sentence paragraph style developed by Jane Schaffer, used to write essay
 Willi Schaefer, a German wine grower and producer based in the Mosel wine region of Germany.

See also 
 Schaeffer (surname)
 Schafer automation system, a system for automating radio station programming
 Schaefer-Bergmann diffraction, the resulting diffraction pattern of light interacting with sound waves in transparent crystals or glasses
 Schaffer collaterals, given off by CA3 pyramidal cells in the hippocampus
 Shafer Commission, another name for the National Commission on Marihuana and Drug Abuse formed in the 1970s to study marijuana abuse in the United States
 Schaefer's theorem, either of two unrelated mathematical theorems